Riot Squad may refer to:
 Police riot squad, see Riot control
 Riot Squad (band), an English punk rock band from Mansfield, England
 Riot Squad (1933 film), an American Pre-Code film
 Riot Squad (1941 film), an American crime film
 Riot Squad (comics), a fictional supervillain team in Marvel Comics

See also
 The Riot Squad, a pop group from London, England